Elías Moreira is a Brazilian association footballer who currently plays for Club Sportivo Luqueño in the Primera División Paraguaya.

Career

Cerro Porteño PF
Moreira joined Cerro PF on 1 July 2013.

He played with Cerro Porteño PF since 2013, in the First, Second and Third divisions of Paraguay. He participated in the 2013 Primera Division Paraguaya, the 2014 Division Intermedia and the 2015 Primera Division B Nacional.

The player joined for pre-season Club Atlético 3 de Febrero at the start of 2015 and was expected to play in the 2015 División Intermedia for the Ciudad del Este club but did not sign and eventually returned to Cerro PF.

Sportivo Luqueño
Moreira united to Sportivo Luqueño in 2016, where his first participation was in Round 1 of the reserve league where he entered the field as a substitute in the second half and scored 13 minutes later.

Statistics
 Cerro PF – 2013 season: 12/4
 Cerro PF – 2014 season:
 Cerro PF – 2015 season:

References

External links
 

Brazilian footballers
Living people
Cerro Porteño (Presidente Franco) footballers
Expatriate footballers in Paraguay
Association football forwards
Year of birth missing (living people)